Svetlana Shimkova (born 18 September 1983) is a Russian weightlifter.

At the 2005 World Weightlifting Championships she won the silver medal in the 63 kg category, with a world record clean and jerk of 139 kg, which was surpassed in the same contest by Pawina Thongsuk with 140 kg.

She won gold in the 63 kg category at the 2005, and again at the 2006 European Weightlifting Championships, in 2006 with another world record clean and jerk of 141 kg.

Shimkova participated in the women's -63 kg class at the 2006 World Weightlifting Championships and won the silver medal, finishing behind Quyang Xiaofang. She snatched 108 kg and clean and jerked an additional 133 kg for a total of 241 kg, 5 kg behind winner Quyang.

At the 2007 World Weightlifting Championships she participated in the 69 kg category, with 112 kg ranked 4th in the snatch, but failed to lift in the clean and jerk.

References 

Living people
1983 births
World Weightlifting Championships medalists
Russian female weightlifters
World record setters in weightlifting
Place of birth missing (living people)
Female powerlifters
European Weightlifting Championships medalists
21st-century Russian women